Like a Storm is a band from Auckland, New Zealand, best known for combining heavy baritone guitar riffs and hard rock songs with didgeridoo. They are the highest charting New Zealand hard rock band in American radio history. Both of their two studio albums, "The End of the Beginning" and "Awaken the Fire", debuted in the Billboard 200. Like a Storm have toured North America extensively as a headline act and have shared American and European stages with Godsmack, Alter Bridge, Gojira, Korn, Shinedown, Three Days Grace and Sevendust. The band has toured with Alter Bridge, Black Stone Cherry, Three Days Grace, Steel Panther, Shinedown and Hellyeah.

History

The band moved from Auckland, New Zealand, to North America. They first began touring the US in 2009, when they were invited to join Creed on their nationwide "Full Circle" Reunion tour. Overwhelming fan response to the band's live show saw their first album, The End of the Beginning, enter Billboard'''s New Artist Charts at No. 61, as well as the Billboard 200 from tour sales alone. 

The band continued extensive American touring into 2010, in support of their first single "Chemical Infatuation" - sharing stages with artists such as Shinedown, Skillet, Puddle of Mudd and Drowning Pool, as well as playing major festivals including Rock on the Range. "Chemical Infatuation" reached No. 43 in the U.S Active Rock Top 100.

2011 saw Like a Storm complete two tours of the US with Alter Bridge. In between tours, the band entered the studio to record Like a Storm Unplugged, an unplugged album featuring acoustic and piano-driven interpretations of some of their most popular songs. Like a Storm Unplugged, produced and mixed by the Brooks brothers, showcases the Brooks brothers playing a wider range of instruments - including didgeridoo, piano, church organ and djembe. In the words of singer/guitarist Matt Brooks, "We all grew up playing any instrument we could get our hands on, and it's awesome to be able to explore these different ideas within the music of Like a Storm. We see it more as re-building the soundscape with different instruments and textures than stripping the songs down".

In 2011, Like a Storm played main stage slots at 3 summer festivals - Boonstock in Gibbons, Alberta, Canada; "Pain in the Grass" for KISW Seattle; and the PDX "RockFest" in Portland. In December 2011, the band was voted Tunelab's "Most Fan Friendly Band." The Brooks brothers responded by thanking their fans on social networking sites. In January 2012, Like a Storm returned to their native New Zealand for a monthlong holiday, and recorded the band's first unplugged DVD "Southern Skies" which was released 22 February 2012. In the movie Chris, Kent, and Matt take viewers to some landmark places and tell of stories growing up in Auckland before playing acoustic versions of fan favorites while at those sites. Southern Skies also gives you a sneak peek at two new songs off of the upcoming album as well as Matt's humorous home video documenting the little time they spent in Australia. While in their hometown, Matt and Kent went on to do an interview with New Zealand's largest rock radio station. At the time singer/guitarist/didgeridoo player Chris was ill and could not attend. A filmed version of the interview can also be found on the "Southern Skies" DVD.

In the Spring of 2012, the band went out on an acoustic tour of the United States with more than 50 shows to promote the Limited Edition Acoustic EP and their Southern Skies DVD. In these shows the band frequently covered songs from other artists as well, such as: "Have You Ever Seen the Rain?" by Creedence Clearwater Revival and "Simple Man" by Lynyrd Skynyrd.

Shortly after their acoustic tour, the band went back to tour alongside Creed in May 2012 with drummer Roye Robley. Like a Storm also played several festivals in Summer 2012. Shows include: Summerfest in Milwaukee, Wisconsin and Common Ground Music Festival in Lansing, Michigan, Jinxfest and Cornfest in Illinois; among others. The day after headlining Jinxfest, Like a Storm headed off to tour with Creed for several more dates. Their first show of their US headlining tour, titled "Unleash the Chaos", was held on 13 October 2012, in support of their EP, "Chaos Theory, Pt. 1." The first single from the record, "Never Surrender," has a music video that came out 21 November 2012. The seven-track "Chaos Theory Part 1," followed shortly after, being released just two days later. Included in the album is a cover of Coolio's "Gangsta's Paradise" which has received airplay on multiple stations including Sirius XM's Octane.

In 2013, the band released the live double-album Worlds Collide: Live from the Ends of the Earth. The album includes two live discs, recorded on opposite sides of the world. The first CD features Like a Storm's high energy rock show, recorded during an American arena tour - while the second disc showcases the band's unplugged side, and was recorded in their native New Zealand. The album features a range of instruments in addition to the traditional hard rock sound - including didgeridoo, djembe, piano, synthesizers, choirs and programming.

The single "Love the Way You Hate Me" was #1 on Sirius XM Octane in North America for five weeks. Its stateside success makes the band the highest-charting New Zealand rock act in US radio history.  The song charted for 19 weeks on the Mainstream Rock chart and peaked at No. 21 there.

Their subsequent single, "Wish You Hell" peaked at #17 on the Mainstream Rock chart. It combines hard rock with delta blues into a sound referred to as "Voodoo Metal", and features slide guitar, jaw harp, and mandolin alongside a heavy rock band track. The third single, "Become the Enemy", peaked at number 11 on the same chart.

The band is signed to Another Century Records. The band's second full-length studio album, and first with record label support, "Awaken the Fire", is also one of the first releases from Another Century. It was written, produced & recorded by the band. Featuring updated versions of the tracks on "Chaos Theory, Pt. 1" along with 4 new tracks, the album was released on 24 February 2015.

In 2015, the band toured in support of Hellyeah alongside of Devour the Day and play festivals including Rock on the Range and Rocklahoma. They also played at Bay City River Roar 2015 in Michigan, along with Devour the Day and Three Days Grace. The band also toured all across Europe supporting the release of "Awaken the Fire".

On 10 May 2018, Like A Storm announced that their upcoming third album, titled Catacombs, will be released on 15 June 2018.

On 18 May 2018, the band released their latest single "The Devil Inside" off of Catacombs. That same day they released a music video for the track and announced the album would be released on 22 June 2018.

Musical style
Like a Storm's musical style has been described as hard rock, post-grunge, and alternative metal.

Band members
 Chris Brooks – lead vocals, rhythm guitar, keyboards, programming, didgeridoo (2005-present)
 Matt Brooks – lead guitar, vocals, keyboards, programming (2005-present)
 Kent Brooks – bass guitar, backing vocals, guitar, keyboards, programming (2005-present)
 Zach Wood – drums, percussion (2014-present)

Discography
Studio albums

Extended plays
 Like a Storm Unplugged (2011)
 Chaos Theory (2012)

Live albums
 Worlds Collide: Live from the Ends of the Earth (2013)

DVDs
 Southern Skies'' (DVD) (2012)

Singles

Music videos

Notes

References
 Staind, Creed and Like A Storm rock out at Mid America Center 
 Like A Storm living dream Wednesday with Creed and Staind tour stop
 Creed cranks out hits for Utah crowd
 Top Ten Heavy Metal/Rock/Hardcore Albums of 2009
 Taking the US by Storm article on National Rock Review 11-Dec-2013
 Concert Review & Interview from Machine Shop, Flint, MI performance on 26-Apr-2014 by National Rock Review 
 Chaos Theory: Part 1 reviewed by National Rock Review 30-Mar-2014
 Concert Review from Dirt Fest performance on 09-Aug-2014 by National Rock Review

External links

 Official website

New Zealand hard rock musical groups
Musical groups established in 2005
Another Century Records artists
Didgeridoo players